Gopurangal Saivathillai is a 1982 Indian Tamil-language film directed by Manivannan and produced by P. Kalaimani. The film stars Mohan, Suhasini and Radha, while S. Ve. Shekher and Vinu Chakravarthy play supporting roles. It revolves around a man who is forcibly married to a woman he deems unattractive, and later begins a relationship with another woman.

Gopurangal Saivathillai is the directorial debut of Manivannan who wrote the screenplay from Kalaimani's story. It was released on 15 October 1982. The film was remade in Telugu as Mukku Pudaka (1983) with Suhasini reprising her role; in Kannada as Brahma Gantu (1985); and in Hindi as Naseeb Apna Apna (1986). The film was also the inspiration behind two Tamil TV series: Kasthuri (2006) and Sundari (2021).

Plot 
Arukkani is an illiterate village girl, and her father is upset at having not been able to find her a suitable groom. One day, her father meets his old friend Bhoothalingam and shares his sadness with him; Bhoothalingam proposes that his son Murali marry her, and Arukkani's father accepts. Murali is a handsome, educated man and a successful sales manager. On hearing of his father's plans, he is excited to meet his future bride. However, on his wedding day, he is shocked to see Arukkani, whom he considers ugly. He only begrudgingly marries her. Murali continues to resent her deeply for the way she looks.

Later, Murali takes a transfer through work to Bangalore, leaving behind his father and wife. In Bangalore, he becomes friendly with his modern and stylish colleague, Julie. They fall in love, marry, and start their life. Two months later, Murali gets a telegram that his mother is sick and rushes home to find that it was a ruse. His dad forces him to take Arukkani with him to Bangalore. Grudgingly, Murali brings her to Bangalore and purposefully loses her in the railway station. However, as a twist of fate, Julie's elder brother Stanley meets Arukkani and brings her to their house that night. Arukkani is shocked upon discovering the truth but keeps quiet on her husband's name to save Murali. Julie hires Arukkani as a stay-in maid until her supposed husband returns. She eventually transforms Arukkani into a brown-skinned beauty and somewhat civilized girl.

A month later, both Arukkani and Murali's fathers make a visit to them. Arukkani's father discovers the truth and is shocked to the core, but Arukkani convinces him to not to reveal the truth to Murali's father, fearing for her husband's safety. Arukkani's father agrees with a heavy heart. He convinces Murali's father to leave at midnight so as to leave the couple at privacy. Both Murali and Stanley start to like Arukkani. Finally, Julie learns the truth and sends Murali away with Arukkani, keeping her own pregnancy a secret.

Cast 

 Mohan as Murali
 Suhasini as Arukkani
 Radha as Julie
 S. Ve. Shekher as Stanley, Julie's brother
 Vinu Chakravarthy as Bhoothalingam
 Manobala as Pathani Bhai
 Loose Mohan
 Senthil
 Sabitha Anand
 T. K. S. Chandran
 Kamala Kamesh
 Vellai Subbaiah
 Sundar
 Nalini
 Master Haja Sheriff

Production 
Gopurangal Saivathillai is the directorial debut of Manivannan, and was initially titled Arukkani.

Soundtrack 
The music was composed by Ilaiyaraaja.

Release and reception 
Gopurangal Saivathillai was released on 15 October 1982. Kalki appreciated the film for its story, Manivannan's direction and Suhasini's performance.

Other versions 
Gopurangal Saivathillai was remade in Telugu as Mukku Pudaka (1983) with Suhasini reprising her role; in Kannada as Brahma Gantu (1985); and in Hindi as Naseeb Apna Apna (1986). The film was also the inspiration behind two Tamil TV series: Kasthuri (2006) and Sundari (2021).

References

External links 
 

1980s Tamil-language films
1982 directorial debut films
1982 films
Films directed by Manivannan
Films scored by Ilaiyaraaja
Films set in Bangalore
Tamil films remade in other languages